Mitrabhum High School is one of the oldest schools in area. The school is situated in a rural area named Kurumgram, West Bengal, India. It is a higher secondary level co-education school in Birbhum district. The school established in 1921 as per the document but this school was built earlier then this.

About 
The Bengali medium school is affiliated with the West Bengal Board of Secondary Education (WBBSE) and West Bengal Council of Higher Secondary Education (WBCHSE) (for 11th and 12th standard). Currently there are approximately 1900+ students with 40 staff.

History 
The school was initially an entrance school. It was upgraded to a high-school in 1921 under the headmaster Manmatha Nath Majumdar's endeavor. He was the headmaster of the school for the next 15 years.

Facilities 
The salient features of the school are:
 Well-equipped laboratories
 A library
 Regular cultural programmes and contests
 A large playground
 Annual sport events
 Midday meals
 NCC Training (presently this facility not available )

Departments

References 

High schools and secondary schools in West Bengal
Schools in Birbhum district
Educational institutions established in 1921
1921 establishments in British India